The black body moray (Gymnothorax melanosomatus) is an eel in the family Muraenidae (moray eels). It was described by Loh Kar-Hoe, Shao Kwang-Tsao, and Chen Hong-Ming in 2011. It is a tropical, marine eel which is known from southeastern Taiwan, off Changbin, Taitung to Shihtiping, Hualien City and in the Pacific Ocean. Males are known to reach a maximum total length of 49.6 cm, while females are known to reach a maximum of 50.4 cm.

The species epithet melansomatus means "black body" in Ancient Greek, and like the eel's common name, it refers to the black colouring of the body.

References

Gymnothorax
Taxa named by Loh Kar-Hoe
Taxa named by Shao Kwang-Tsao
Taxa named by Chen Hong-Ming

Fish described in 2011